Presidential elections were held for the first time in Tajikistan on 24 November 1991. The result was a victory for Rahmon Nabiyev of the Communist Party of Tajikistan, who received 60% of the vote. Voter turnout was 86.5%.

Results

Aftermath

After the elections, protesters gathered to peacefully protest the results. However, eventually angry protesters turned to violence, causing them to clash with the military in Khujand. This sparked the five-year long Tajikistani Civil War. Nabiyev was ambushed and held at gunpoint while going to Dushanbe Airport, where he was forced to resign.

References

Presidential
Presidential elections in Tajikistan
Tajikistan